Leek F.C. was an English football club.

History
The club played in the FA Cup from 1884 to 1893, reaching the Fifth Round in 1886.

References

Defunct football clubs in England
Leek, Staffordshire
Defunct football clubs in Staffordshire
Association football clubs established in the 19th century